Clark International Airport, known as Diosdado Macapagal International Airport from 2003 to 2012, is an international airport covering portions of the cities of Angeles and Mabalacat within the Clark Freeport Zone in the province of Pampanga, Philippines. It is accessible through the Subic–Clark–Tarlac Expressway (SCTEX).

The airport serves Central Luzon, Northern Luzon, and to an extent, Metro Manila. The name is derived from the former American Clark Air Base which was the largest overseas base of the United States Air Force until it was closed in 1991 and handed over to the Government of the Philippines.

The airport is managed and operated by Luzon International Premier Airport Development (LIPAD) Corp., a consortium of JG Summit Holdings, Filinvest Development Corporation, Philippine Airport Ground Support Solutions (PAGSS) Inc., and Changi Airports Philippines Pte. Ltd.; while the southern part of the facility is utilized by the Philippine Air Force as Clark Air Base.

The airport serves both international and domestic flights. The airport was nominated for the 2021  awards but lost to LaGuardia Airport Terminal B as the best new airport in 2021.

History 

The United States Cavalry established Fort Stotsenberg in 1902 and later converted a portion of it into an air field, which was, in turn, renamed Clark Air Field in 1919—in honor of aviator Major Harold Melville Clark—and was used as one of the most important overseas bases during World War II.

In 1947, the RP-US Military Bases Agreement was signed, integrating Clark Air Field and Fort Stotsenberg into Clark Air Base but, after the eruption of Mount Pinatubo in June 1991 and the non-renewal of the military bases agreement, Clark Air Base was reverted to the Philippine government.

The Bases Conversion Development Act of 1992 accelerated the conversion of Clark Air Base into a Special Economic Zone, and in 2007, the Congress of the Philippines enacted Republic Act No. 9400, which renamed the base to Clark Freeport Philippines. It is now segregated in two separate entities: Clark Freeport Zone administered by the Clark Development Corporation, and the Clark Civil Aviation Complex administered by the Clark International Airport Corporation (CIAC).

In 1993, the former Clark Air Base was reopened as the Clark Special Economic Zone (CSEZ) after the area was cleared from lahar debris from Mount Pinatubo explosion and a typhoon that followed. During the administration of President Fidel V. Ramos, it was designated to be the future primary international gateway of the Philippines and the major international airport of Metro Manila and its neighboring provinces when Ninoy Aquino International Airport in Metro Manila has reached full capacity and can no longer be expanded.

CIAC traces its origin from Republic Act No. 7227, otherwise known as the "Bases Conversion and Development Act of 1992", which authorized the conversion of several military reservations, including the former Clark Air Base, into sustainable economic zones. Jurisdiction over the corporation shifted from the Bases Conversion Development Authority (BCDA) and the Clark Development Corporation (CDC) since its formal incorporation with the SEC in 1995.

The airport opened for commercial operations on June 16, 1996.

In 2003, President Gloria Macapagal Arroyo renamed the airport to Diosdado Macapagal International Airport (DMIA), in memory of her father, former President Diosdado Macapagal, and ordered the Clark International Airport Corporation (CIAC) in February 2007 to fund the US$1.7 billion (₱76.5 billion) expansion of DMIA and the approval of a US$2 million (₱90 million) study plan financed by the Korean International Cooperation Agency. The first stage of Clark Airport's expansion program, a ₱130 million terminal expansion, was completed in January 2008 to accommodate more than 2 million passengers annually.

In 2011, CIAC was transferred from the Bases Conversion and Development Authority and became an attached agency of the Department of Transportation and Communications (DOTC) by virtue of Executive Order No. 64 issued by President Benigno Aquino III.

The airport's name was reverted to Clark International Airport in February 2012, but the original passenger terminal continued to bear Macapagal's name.

On February 28, 2017, President Rodrigo Duterte issued Executive Order No. 14, reverting CIAC as a subsidiary of the BCDA, but with the Department of Transportation (DOTr) maintaining supervision and operational control of the airport.

Expansion and future development 
Four new terminals are expected to be completed and all will be fully operational by 2025. Upon completion, these four terminals will boost Clark's passenger capacity to more than 110 million annually. The airport is also being groomed to become one of the country's first "aerotropolis" or a community that features a world-class airport and surrounded by business clusters and residential developments. The project involves the operations and maintenance of the existing and the proposed new passenger terminal buildings on the airport with a 25-year concession period. The ₱12.55-billion project involves the construction of a new passenger terminal building with a design capacity of twelve million passengers per annum.

North Luzon Airport Consortium (NLAC), which is a consortium of JG Summit Holdings, Filinvest Development Corporation, Philippine Airport Ground Support Solutions Inc. and Changi Airports Philippines Pte. Ltd. (which is a subsidiary of Changi Airports International Pte. Ltd, which is itself a subsidiary of Changi Airport Group, the operator of Singapore Changi Airport) won the open bid by the BCDA to take over the operations and maintenance of the airport. On January 25, 2019, NLAC signed the 25-year contract for the operations and maintenance for the airport. On August 16, Clark International Airport's operations and maintenance were officially handed over to the winning bid (now renamed as Luzon International Premier Airport Development (LIPAD) Corporation in a ceremony held at the new terminal building along with the unveiling of its new logo.

The new passenger terminal building was completed in September 2020. Trial flights to and from the new terminal were conducted in December 2021, and the terminal opened for commercial operations on May 2, 2022. All flights moved to the new terminal on the day of its opening. Following the opening of the new terminal, the old terminal was decommissioned. The new terminal was officially opened by President Bongbong Marcos during a grand opening event on September 28.

Geographical location 
The airport lies in between Mount Pinatubo to the west and Mount Arayat to the east.

The airport site is inside the Clark Freeport Zone's Civil Aviation Complex which occupies  and directly linked to the Subic–Clark–Tarlac Expressway (SCTEX) which is connected to the North Luzon Expressway (NLEX) providing a direct link to Metro Manila.

It has a local catchment area with an estimated population of 23 million covering the Ilocos Region, Cagayan Valley, Central Luzon, the Cordillera Administrative Region, and northern Metro Manila.

Structure

Passenger terminal
The airport has a  four-level passenger terminal building which replaced the original terminal in 2022.

The ground level holds the baggage claim and arrival halls, while the second floor holds the transfer facilities, immigration facilities for arriving international passengers, and 18 jet bridges. Aside from the jet bridges, there are remote gates at the apron. The third level houses the check-in counters and pre-departure areas including gate lounges, while the fourth level houses food and beverage areas and commercially important person lounges.

The facade of the terminal sports a wave roof design inspired by the mountains of Mount Arayat, Mount Pinatubo, and the Sierra Madre mountain range.

Former terminal

The original terminal was expanded for $3 million (PH₱130 million) to accommodate 1 million passengers annually. The expansion project was inaugurated by President Arroyo in April 2008 to serve the growing passenger volume due to the entry of foreign and local budget carriers at the airport.

The first phase of the expansion of the terminal started in April 2010 at a cost of $12 million (PH₱550 million), saw a second story, arrival and departure lounges, and two aerobridges added to the terminal building. The expansion boosted the airport's capacity to 2.5 million annually.

The passenger terminal was expanded again in 2013 at a cost of $9.6 million (PH₱417 million), increasing the capacity of the terminal from 2.5 million to 4.2 million passengers per annum. It added 21 new check-in counters, increasing the total number of counters from 13 to 34. Five arrival counters and 12 departures counters were also constructed. The expanded terminal has eight entry points and three customs stations. The modernized terminal started operations in May 2013.

Runways
Clark International Airport used to have two  parallel runways. Since the runways are closely spaced, the secondary runway (02L/20R) has been decommissioned and is no longer in use. The new terminal occupies the end that was formerly Runway 20R, while a new maintenance hangar is currently being constructed on the stopway of Runway 02L.
It is equipped with various navigational aids and lighting facilities, and it has a Category 1 rating for precision approach.
Unlike the primary runway, the secondary runway was used for visual flight rules (VFR) only. The secondary runway was decommissioned in 2017.

Air traffic control tower
The tower is projected to be completed by December 2021.

Airlines and destinations

Passenger

Cargo

Statistics
Data from Clark International Airport Corporation (CIAC).

Awards
 Center for Asia Pacific Aviation Low-Cost Airport of the Year (2006)
 Frost & Sullivan Asia Pacific Aerospace and Defense Awards Airport of the Year (2008) (for airports under 15 million passengers category)
 Routes Airport Marketing Awards Winner (2013) (for 'Under 20 Million' Category)

Ground transportation

Motor vehicle
The Subic–Clark–Tarlac Expressway (SCTEx) provides high-speed automobile access to the airport from the southwest, with two exits: Clark North and Clark South interchange. The latter leads directly to Clark. Passengers with connecting flights at Ninoy Aquino International Airport in Metro Manila can take the North Luzon Expressway which is linked via SCTEx, then passing through Epifanio de los Santos Avenue, Roxas Boulevard, and finally onto NAIA Road. Alternatively, since December 29, 2020, drivers can pay a toll to use Skyway, the newest expressway between Clark and NAIA, from NLEx to NAIA Expressway connecting NAIA Terminals 1, 2 and 3.

Park and fly services are provided within the airport as well.

Public transportation
For short-distance routes, air-conditioned jeepneys connect Clark to nearby Dau Bus Terminal in Mabalacat and SM City Clark in Angeles City. From Dau, passengers can ride intercity buses leading to other cities and towns in Northern and Central Luzon as well as Metro Manila. Direct Premium Point-to-Point Bus Services (P2Ps) for long-distance routes are provided by four bus companies leading to TriNoma in Quezon City, Subic and neighboring Olongapo in Zambales, Dagupan in Pangasinan, and Vigan in Ilocos Sur.

The airport will also be served by the Clark International Airport station of the North–South Commuter Railway, connecting the airport to the New Clark City in Capas, Tarlac, as well as Tutuban in Manila and Calamba in Laguna. The connection is scheduled to be completed by 2023.

See also

 History of Clark Air Base

Notes and references

Notes

References

External links

 
 
 

Airports in the Philippines
Transportation in Pampanga
Transportation in Metro Manila
Buildings and structures in Angeles City
Buildings and structures in Mabalacat
Tourism in Metro Manila
Transportation in Luzon
Clark Freeport Zone
1996 establishments in the Philippines
Airports established in 1996